Thomas P. McCreesh (March 2, 1928 – February 19, 2016) was an American politician from Pennsylvania who served as a Democratic member of the Pennsylvania State Senate for the 4th district from 1959 to 1968 and for the 8th district from 1969 to 1974. He succeeded his father John J. McCreesh in the senate upon his retirement in 1958.

Early life and education
He was born in Philadelphia, Pennsylvania to John J. and Susan (née McCabe) McCreesh. He was a rowing champion in 1948 for the Penn Athletic Rowing Association.  He served in the Korean War.  He was a real estate broker and appraiser. He attended Saint Joseph's University and, in 1950, graduated with a Bachelor of Science degree in political science. In 1963, he married Rita McTamney. He also served as a page in the Pennsylvania State senate in the 1940s.

McCreesh donated his body to medical science.

References

1928 births
2016 deaths
20th-century American politicians
Military personnel of the Korean War
Democratic Party Pennsylvania state senators
Politicians from Philadelphia
Saint Joseph's University alumni